This is a list of 122 species in Hydrometra, a genus of water measurers in the family Hydrometridae.

Hydrometra species

 Hydrometra acapulcana Drake, 1952 i c g
 Hydrometra aculeata Montrouzier in Perroud, 1864 i c g
 Hydrometra adnexa Drake, 1956 i c g
 Hydrometra aegyptia Hungerford and Evans, 1934 i c g
 Hydrometra aemula Drake, 1956 i c g
 Hydrometra aequatoriana Cianferoni and Buzzetti, 2012 i c g
 Hydrometra africana Hungerford and Evans, 1934 i c g
 Hydrometra albolineata (Scott, 1874) i c g
 Hydrometra albolineolata Reuter, 1882 i c g
 Hydrometra alloiona Drake and Lauck, 1959 i c g
 Hydrometra ambulator Stål, 1855 i c g
 Hydrometra annamana Hungerford and Evans, 1934 i c g
 Hydrometra argentina Berg, 1879 i c g
 Hydrometra australis Say, 1832 i c g b
 Hydrometra balkei Zettel, 2014 i c g
 Hydrometra barei Hungerford, 1927 i c g
 Hydrometra barrana Drake, 1952 i c g
 Hydrometra bifurcata Hungerford and Evans, 1934 i c g
 Hydrometra borneensis Zettel and Yang, 2004 i c g
 Hydrometra brevitarsus Zettel and Yang, 2004 i c g
 Hydrometra butleri Hungerford and Evans, 1934 i c g
 Hydrometra caraiba Guérin-Méneville, 1857 i c g
 Hydrometra carayoni Poisson, 1948 i c g
 Hydrometra carinata J. Polhemus and D. Polhemus, 1995 i c g
 Hydrometra cavernicola J. Polhemus and D. Polhemus, 1987 i c g
 Hydrometra chaweewanae Sites and J. Polhemus, 2003 i c g
 Hydrometra cherukolensis Jehamalar and Chandra, 2014 i c g
 Hydrometra chinai Hungerford and Evans, 1934 i c g
 Hydrometra chopardi Poisson, 1941 i c g
 Hydrometra ciliata Mychajliw, 1961 i c g
 Hydrometra ciliosa Drake and Lauck, 1959 i c g
 Hydrometra claudie J. Polhemus and Lansbury, 1997 i c g
 Hydrometra comata Torre-Bueno, 1926 i c g
 Hydrometra consimilis Barber, 1923 i c g
 Hydrometra cracens J. Polhemus and D. Polhemus, 1995 i c g
 Hydrometra crossa Drake and Lauck, 1959 i c g
 Hydrometra cyprina Torre-Bueno, 1926 i c g
 Hydrometra darwiniana J. Polhemus and Lansbury, 1997 i c g
 Hydrometra eioana J. Polhemus and Lansbury, 1997 i c g
 Hydrometra exalla Drake and Lauck, 1959 i c g
 Hydrometra exilis Torre-Bueno, 1926 i c g
 Hydrometra fanjahira Hungerford and Evans, 1934 i c g
 Hydrometra feta Hale, 1925 i c g
 Hydrometra fruhstorferi Hungerford and Evans, 1934 i c g
 Hydrometra fuanucana Drake, 1954 i c g
 Hydrometra gagnei J. Polhemus and D. Polhemus, 1995 i c g
 Hydrometra gibara Torre-Bueno, 1926 i c g
 Hydrometra gilloglyi J. Polhemus and D. Polhemus, 1995 i c g
 Hydrometra goodi Hungerford, 1951 i c g
 Hydrometra gracilenta Horváth, 1899 i c g
 Hydrometra grassei Poisson, 1945 i c g
 Hydrometra greeni Kirkaldy, 1898 i c g
 Hydrometra groehni Andersen, 2003 i c g
 Hydrometra guianana Hungerford and Evans, 1934 i c g
 Hydrometra halei Hungerford and Evans, 1934 i c g
 Hydrometra heoki Zettel and Yang, 2004 i c g
 Hydrometra horvathi Hungerford and Evans, 1934 i c g
 Hydrometra huallagana Drake, 1954 i c g
 Hydrometra hungerfordi Torre-Bueno, 1926 i c g
 Hydrometra hutchinsoni Hungerford and Evans, 1934 i c g
 Hydrometra intonsa Drake and Hottes, 1952 i c g
 Hydrometra isaka Hungerford and Evans, 1934 i c g
 Hydrometra jaczewskii Lundblad, 1933 i c g
 Hydrometra jourama J. Polhemus and Lansbury, 1997 i c g
 Hydrometra juba Linnavuori, 1971 i c g
 Hydrometra julieni Hungerford and Evans, 1934 i c g
 Hydrometra julienoidea J. Polhemus and D. Polhemus, 1995 i c g
 Hydrometra kahallensis Karunaratne, 1969 i c g
 Hydrometra kelantan J. Polhemus and D. Polhemus, 1995 i c g
 Hydrometra kiunga J. Polhemus and Lansbury, 1997 i c g
 Hydrometra lentipes Champion, 1898 i c g
 Hydrometra lillianis Torre-Bueno, 1926 i c g
 Hydrometra lineata Eschscholtz, 1822 i c g
 Hydrometra lombok J. Polhemus and D. Polhemus, 1995 i c g
 Hydrometra longicapitis Torre-Bueno, 1927 i c g
 Hydrometra madagascarensis Hungerford and Evans, 1934 i c g
 Hydrometra maidli Hungerford and Evans, 1934 i c g
 Hydrometra maindroni Hungerford and Evans, 1934 i c g
 Hydrometra mameti Hungerford, 1951 i c g
 Hydrometra marani Hoberlandt, 1942 i c g
 Hydrometra martini Kirkaldy, 1900 i c g b
 Hydrometra metator Buchanan-White, 1879 i c g
 Hydrometra mindoroensis J. Polhemus in J. Polhemus and Reisen, 1976 i c g
 Hydrometra moneta Linnavuori, 1981 i c g
 Hydrometra monodi Poisson, 1939 i c g
 Hydrometra naiades Kirkaldy, 1902 i c g
 Hydrometra nicobarensis Jehamalar and Chandra, 2014 i c g
 Hydrometra novahollandiae J. Polhemus and Lansbury, 1997 i c g
 Hydrometra okinawana Drake, 1951 i c g
 Hydrometra olallai Mychajliw, 1961 i c g
 Hydrometra orientalis Lundblad, 1933 i c g
 Hydrometra panamensis Drake, 1952 i c g
 Hydrometra papuana Kirkaldy, 1901 i c g
 Hydrometra phytophila J. Polhemus and D. Polhemus, 1987 i c g
 Hydrometra placita Drake, 1953 i c g
 Hydrometra poissoni Hungerford, 1951 i c g
 Hydrometra priscillae Torre-Bueno, 1926 i c g
 Hydrometra procera Horváth, 1905 i c g
 Hydrometra quadrispina Perez Goodwyn, 2001 i c g
 Hydrometra rhodesiana Hungerford and Evans, 1934 i c g
 Hydrometra ribesci Hungerford, 1938 g
 Hydrometra ripicola Andersen, 1992 i c g
 Hydrometra sapiranga Moreira and Barbosa, 2013 i c g
 Hydrometra scotti Brown, 1951 i c g
 Hydrometra seychellensis J. Polhemus and D. Polhemus, 1995 i c g
 Hydrometra sjoestedti Lundblad, 1934 i c g
 Hydrometra smithi Hungerford and Evans, 1934 i c g
 Hydrometra somaliensis Poisson, 1949 i c g
 Hydrometra stagnorum (Linnaeus, 1758) i c g
 Hydrometra strigosa (Skuse, 1893) i c g
 Hydrometra sztolcmani Jaczewski, 1928 i c g
 Hydrometra taxcana Drake and Hottes, 1952 i c g
 Hydrometra thomasi Mychajliw, 1961 i c g
 Hydrometra transvaalensis Hungerford and Evans, 1934 i c g
 Hydrometra turneri Hungerford and Evans, 1934 i c g
 Hydrometra ugandae Jaczewski, 1932 i c g
 Hydrometra wileyae Hungerford, 1923 i c g
 Hydrometra williamsi Hungerford and Evans, 1934 i c g
 Hydrometra yamoussoukroi Poisson, 1945 i c g
 Hydrometra yaqubi Ghauri, 1964 i c g
 Hydrometra zeteki Drake, 1952 i c g
 Hydrometra zeylanica Gunawardane and Karunaratne, 1965 i c g

Data sources: i = ITIS, c = Catalogue of Life, g = GBIF, b = Bugguide.net

References

Hydrometra
Articles created by Qbugbot